U-71 may refer to one of the following German submarines:

 , a Type UE I submarine launched in 1915 and that served in World War I until surrendered on 23 February 1919; broken up at Cherbourg in 1921
 During World War I, Germany also had these submarines with similar names:
 , a Type UB III submarine launched in 1917 and sunk on 21 April 1918
 , a Type UC II submarine launched in 1916 and sunk on 20 February 1919 on way to surrender
, a Type VIIC submarine that served in World War II until scuttled on 2 May 1945

Submarines of Germany